Strachan is a surname of Scottish origin (see Clan Strachan, Strachan Baronets), which is pronounced  or . Notable people with the surname include:

Allerdyce Strachan, Bahamian police officer
Andy Strachan, drummer
Anthonique Strachan, Bahamian runner
Archibald Strachan, Scottish soldier
Douglas Strachan, Scottish designer of stained glass windows
Gavin Strachan, Scottish footballer 
Geoffrey Strachan, translator of French and German into English
Gilbert Strachan, Professor of medicine
Graeme Strachan, Australian singer and television personality, known as "Shirley" Strachan
Gordon Strachan, Scottish footballer and manager
Gordon Strachan (minister) (1934–2010), Church of Scotland minister, theologian, university lecturer and author
Gordon C. Strachan, aide to H R Haldeman
Harcus Strachan, a Scottish-born Canadian recipient of the Victoria Cross
Hew Strachan, military historian
Hugh Strachan, Scottish footballer
James Strachan (ice hockey), Canadian ice hockey executive
James Strachan (programmer), developer of the Apache Groovy programming language
James McGill Strachan, Canadian lawyer
Sir John Strachan, 5th Baronet, British sea captain
John Strachan (1778–1867), Anglican bishop in Canada
John Strachan (linguist), scholar of Celtic languages
John Strachan (singer) 
Joshua Strachan, musician, record producer
Keith Strachan, composer, theatre director
Linda Strachan, Scottish author
Matthew Strachan (1970–2021), songwriter
Merrill Strachan, Canadian politician
Mike Strachan (disambiguation), multiple people
Michaela Strachan, British TV presenter
Sir Richard Strachan, 6th Baronet, British admiral
Steve Strachan (sheriff), American law enforcement officer and politician
Zoë Strachan, Scottish novelist

See also
Strachan, Aberdeenshire
Strachan Open, 1992–1994 professional snooker tournament, sponsored by billiard cloth company Strachan
Strahan (surname)

References

Scottish surnames